Ieva Andrejevaitė (born 1 January 1988) is a Lithuanian actress. She has acted in films and TV series in Great Britain, Lithuania, Russia, United States, and Ukraine.

Filmography
2012 – , role: Marija; Lithuanian TV series
2014 – , role: Inga
2015 –
 Fartsa (TV series), role: Tanya ; Russian
 Kill Your Friends, role: Anna;British satirical black comedy crime-thriller film
 He's a Dragon, role: Yaroslava;  Russian 3D romantic fantasy adventure film 
2016 – The Good Boy, role: school teacher; Russian comedy film
2016–2019 – Berlin Station (TV series), role: Irina Krik; American drama television series
2017 –
  ("Emilija from the Liberty Avenue"), lead role: Emilija; Lithuanian historical drama
 «Штрафник»
 «Перекрёстки судьбы»
2018 – 
 , role: Angelina; Ukrainian comedy film, with elements of fantasy
 «Русалки»
 «Пуля»
2019 – , role: Olga, assistant of the lead character Dyumin; Russian comedy film
2020 –
 O2, as Tatjana Kostrova; Estonian-Latvian-Lithuanian-Finnish historical spy thriller film
 Skylines, as Alexi and Kate; American science fiction action film 
 «Зона комфорта»
2021 – «Макс Ангер»﻿ 
2022 – 
 «Селфимания»
 «Чайки»
 2023 – «Stonehouse (TV series)»

References

External links

1988 births
Living people
Lithuanian film actresses
Actresses from Vilnius
21st-century Lithuanian actresses